Dead Zone: The Grateful Dead CD Collection (1977–1987) is a six-CD boxed set retrospect of the Grateful Dead's studio and live albums during their time with Arista Records from 1977 to 1987. Prior to 1977, the band was on its own label, Grateful Dead Records.

This compilation includes the albums Terrapin Station, Shakedown Street, Go to Heaven, Reckoning, Dead Set, and In the Dark. The set does not contain any new or expanded recordings.

Personnel
 Jerry Garcia – guitar, vocals
 Bob Weir – guitar, vocals
 Brent Mydland – keyboards, vocals
 Keith Godchaux – keyboards, vocals
 Donna Jean Godchaux – vocals
 Phil Lesh – bass
 Bill Kreutzmann – drums
 Mickey Hart – drums

References

1987 compilation albums
Arista Records compilation albums
Grateful Dead compilation albums